The Wonawinta mine is one of the largest silver mines in Australia and in the world. The mine is located in the south of the country, 80 km south of Cobar in New South Wales. The mine has estimated reserves of 50 million oz of silver.

In August 2014 the operating mine was put up for sale. It was acquired by Southern Cross Goldfields Ltd. There was some public concerns aired over the manner in which the sale was concluded.

References

 TGM Group: Description of Wonawinta Mine construction

Silver mines in New South Wales